George Mark Moraes (11 May 1905 – April 1994) popularly known by his pen name, George M. Moraes, was an Indian historian, author, writer and professor from Goa. He has over 29 historical and research works to his name which were published in 74 publications and 542 library holdings. He is considered as one of the greatest Goan intellectuals and historians. Moraes is best known for his book, The Kadamba Kula (1931).

Early life and education
George Mark Moraes was born on 11 May 1905 at Bencleamvaddo, Cuncolim. He had completed his Doctor of Philosophy (Ph.D) in English.

Career
Moraes was a professor of history at St. Xavier's College, Mumbai. His book, The Kadamba Kula (1931) is his research on the Kadamba dynasty. According to Google Books, his work was chosen by the scholars for being culturally important and is now part of the conceptualisation of civilization. He has also authored books, History of Christians in India, Historiography of Indian Languages, and many other published in several editions.

Moraes was also employed in top-tier institutions like, Royal Asiatic Society and the Indian Historical Research Commission.

Legacy
Few locals tried to set-up a library in honour of Moraes. On 18 July 2020, the locals demanded to name the newly constructed Goa State Urban Development Agency (GSUDA) building in his name.

Aftermath
Moraes's heritage house at Bencleamvaddo, Cuncolim collapsed on 17 July 2020 due to continuous rains. It was in a run-down condition for many years and  worsened with time. The ceiling of the house were crumbled during monsoons in 2019, with the remainder of the house falling apart.

The distant relatives of Moraes were in the process of claiming the ownership of the property to sell it. However the locals of Cuncolim had made an appeal to the Cuncolim Municipal Council prior to the crumbling to acquire the land and the said heritage house to build a childrens' park in Moraes's name.

The locals then questioned the authorities as to why the state administration and local government did not take any initiative in preserving Moraes's home as a historical heritage site.

References

1905 births
1994 deaths
Indian historians
Indian writers
People from South Goa district
Goan people
20th-century Indian historians